HDWiki is a Chinese wiki software developed by the online encyclopedia Hudong. It is used by over 1000 websites in China.

License and development 

The source code for HDWiki is free for anyone to download without registration HDWiki is free for non-commercial use, while commercial use requires a special licensing agreement from Hudong.

Despite the name "kaiyuan" (implying "open-source" in Chinese) in the URL of the Hudong website, HDWiki is not open-source software.

References

External links 
 HDWiki website

Proprietary wiki software